The Carriage Repair Workshop, Harnaut provides bogie maintenance services for India's East Central Railway. According to Indian Railways's rules, coaches require preventive maintenance every eighteen months. The facility employs 1,000 and handles fifty units each month.

Workshop is located at near Harnaut railway station on Bakhtiyarpur-Tilaiya line at NH 30A. And 55 km from Patna.

History
East Central Railway had no carriage repair workshop and was totally dependent on ER and NER. President APJ Abdul Kalam had laid the foundation stone for the workshop at Harnaut on 30 June 2003, during Nitish Kumar's tenure as railway minister. Most of its infrastructure was completed in 2013 and in the future there is a plan to repair air-conditioned coaches as well.

Infrastructure

The Harnaut workshop is located 115 acres of land, the workshop on 78 acres and staff quarters on 37 acres.

Constructed at an expenditure of Rs. 328 crore, it has all together eighteen repair workshops. It is one of the most advanced coach factories in the country with the 'double stacked coach maintenance technology' to carry out periodical overhauling of coaches. The workshop is headed by the Chief Workshop manager. There are five departments dealing with various activities such as Mechanical, Electrical, Materials Management, Finance & Accounts, HRD, Audit & Security. It has a total employee strength of approx 5,000.

Main activities
The workshop undertakes the periodic overhauling. According to project in-charge Sunil Kumar, the railways has installed machines, including bogie testing apparatus, surface wheel lathe, plasma profile cutting machines and other essential plants required for smooth functioning of the workshop.

Gallery

See also
 Harnaut City
 Harnaut Railway Station

References

 CRW, Harnaut. Kendriya vidyalaya. 28 June 2011. Retrieved 16 July 2015.
  Railnews.com. Retrieved 16 July 2015.
 ECR indianrailways.gov.in. Retrieved 16 July 2015.

Nalanda district
Rail transport in Bihar
Manufacturing plants in Bihar
Railway depots in India